Hanover Township is one of eleven townships in Lake County, Indiana, United States. As of the 2010 census, its population was 12,443 and it contained 4,861 housing units.

Hanover Township was established in 1853.

Geography

Education
Hanover Township is served by the Hanover Community School Corporation which includes Hanover Central Junior-Senior High School.

Notable places
The Shrine of Christ's Passion, opened in 2008, in the town of St. John, is within the township.

References

External links

Townships in Lake County, Indiana
Townships in Indiana
populated places established in 1853
1853 establishments in Indiana